Major General Nestor Shali Shalauda is a retired  Namibian military officer who served as commander of the Namibian Army (NA). He was appointed the commander of the Namibian Army in July 2017 until his retirement on 31 July 2019.

Career
Major General Shalauda went into exile in 1974 and underwent basic infantry training Oshatotwa, Zambia in 1975 under the People's Liberation Army of Namibia. At Independence he was inducted into the Namibian Defence Force as a lieutenant and appointed as a platoon leader. In 1992 he was promoted to captain and appointed as a battery commander, in 1998 he was promoted to major and appointed as a regimental second in command. In 2004 he was promoted to lieutenant colonel and appointed as a regimental commanding officer. In 2011 he was promoted to colonel and appointed as a 2IC of 12 Motorised  Infantry Brigade. In 2014 he was promoted to brigadier general and appointed as general officer commanding 4 Artillery Brigade. In 2015 he was appointed as Deputy Army Commander.

Honours and decorations
  Namibian Army Pioneer Medal
  Army Ten Years Service Medal
  NDF Campaign Medal 
  Army Twenty Years Service Medal
 Army Commendation Medal

References

Living people
Namibian military personnel
People's Liberation Army of Namibia personnel
1958 births